sRNA71 is a Bacterial small RNA discovered by RNA-seq analysis of the multiresistant Staphylococcus aureus strain ST239 grown in the presence of antibiotics  and found throughout the Staphylococcus genus.
It is thought to be a trans-encoded small RNA expressed in diverse conditions and media. The 5’ position is uncertain, this record adds 12 bases to the initial sRNA71 sequence to include additional conserved nucleotides.

References

External links
 

Non-coding RNA